Blackpool and The Fylde College (B&FC) is a further and higher education college in Blackpool, Lancashire, England.

Facilities include four main campuses located across the Fylde Coast, all of which have recently undergone or are currently undergoing major redevelopment.

The college is a Regional Teaching Partner of Lancaster University and offers full and part-time further education, higher education and vocational courses along with apprenticeships. From September 2016 the college also holds its own foundation degree awarding powers.

The sites in Fleetwood form a specialised Nautical campus, which teaches courses for merchant seafarers and offshore workers. As well as delivering a broad portfolio of accredited safety, survival and fire training courses, qualifications are also awarded by The Scottish Qualifications Authority, Lancaster University as well as the college itself.

History

The history of B&FC dates back to 1892's opening of Fleetwood's School for Fishermen, which later developed into the Nautical campus. Blackpool Technical College (B&FC's Palatine Road site, later expanded into Blackpool Technical College and School of Art) opened in 1937, and expanded again to include the Bispham site c.1970 (Hall, A Hundred Years of Blackpool Education, Blackpool Education Committee, 1970). The Fleetwood and Blackpool colleges combined into B&FC in 1987. The college's Lytham site has most recently been converted to provide sixth form facilities, in conjunction with Lytham St Annes Technology and Performing Arts College.

Campuses
 Bispham
 Gateway
 Fleetwood Nautical
 Seasiders Learning 
 University Centre
 Lancashire Energy HQ

Students' Union
B&FC Students' Union is affiliated with the NUS and works in partnership with the college. The SU represents students on a range of issues, including equality and diversity, education and social activities.

Alumni

Ian Anderson, rock musician
Peter Baynham, comedian and screenwriter
Kate Ford, actress
Craig McDean, photographer
Sarah Myerscough, model maker / artist for Blackpool Illuminations, previously at Blackpool Pleasure Beach
Helen Owen, theatre actress
Craig Parkinson, actor
Jodie Prenger, actress and singer
John Simm, actor

References

External links
 Official site

Buildings and structures in Blackpool
Buildings and structures in the Borough of Fylde
Buildings and structures in Fleetwood
Education in Blackpool
Education in the Borough of Fylde
Education in the Borough of Wyre
Further education colleges in the Collab Group
Further education colleges in Lancashire
Maritime colleges in the United Kingdom